Hanuman Beniwal (born 2 March 1972) is an Indian politician serving as the Member of Parliament in the 17th Lok Sabha from Nagaur since 2019. He is founding member and National Convenor of the Rashtriya Loktantrik Party in 29 October 2018 in Jaipur.

Early life 
Beniwal was born on 2 March 1972 to Ram Dev and Mohini Devi in Barangaon village of Nagaur district in Rajasthan. He graduated with a Bachelor of Arts degree from Rajasthan University in 1993. He did L.L.B. in 1998. He married Kanika Beniwal on 9 December 2009, with whom he has a son and a daughter.

Career  
Beniwal was suspended from the Bhartiya Janta Party (BJP) in 2013 after his accusations on party members of having connection with the leaders of the rival Indian National Congress. He successfully organised five Kisan Hunkar Maha Rallies in Nagaur, Barmer, Bikaner, Sikar, Jaipur and launched a political party called Rashtriya Loktantrik Party with an election symbol of "Bottle" in Jaipur on 29 October 2018.

Beniwal is a farming leader in Nagaur and won his assembly seat third time as a candidate of his own party RLP. In 2013 he was an Independent candidate and defeated his rival BJP candidate by 23,020 votes. In 2008 he was a BJP candidate and defeated his rival BSP candidate by 24,443 votes.

Yunus Khan 
Beniwal accused cabinet minister Yunus Khan of helping alleged gangster Anandpal Singh escape police custody after the alleged gangster helped him win the Assembly election in 2013. He demanded a CBI inquiry.

Rajasthan University  
The National Students Union of India (NSUI) staged a protest at Rajasthan University in 2015, demanding action against the police for "excessive brutality". The agitation was held a day after the police -charged a group of students protesting an attack on Beniwal. The students were organising a peaceful rally when the police charged. Many NSUI students were injured. The NSUI office was raided. Around 500 students under the banner ‘Kisaan Yuva Aakrosh Rally’ had assembled to protest the alleged attack on Beniwal. The procession turned violent when police tried to contain them on campus, resulting in stone pelting by the students. The police resorted to a lathi-charge to disperse them. This led to vandalism and chaos, injuring 30 students and 18 policemen.

Assembly protest 
On 25 April 2017, after Beniwal's questions were cancelled by speaker Kailash Meghwal since they were related to three separate departments, the former protested against the speaker by go to the well and tearing up his papers, drawing criticism from Parliament Affairs Minister Rajendra Rathore and the speaker.

Farmer protest
In 2020, Beniwal joined the protest against the farmer bills, calling it 'Anti-Farmers'. He went on to say that if he had been present in the Lok Sabha, he would have torn up the farm bills.

References

External links 

1972 births
Living people
Lok Sabha members from Rajasthan
Bharatiya Janata Party politicians from Rajasthan
Rajasthan MLAs 2013–2018
People from Nagaur district
India MPs 2019–present
Rashtriya Loktantrik Party politicians